Leicester is an unincorporated community in Buncombe County, North Carolina United States; although incorporating was proposed in 2007 and an incorporation bill was briefly filed in the North Carolina General Assembly, no measure has been adopted. Leicester is part of the Asheville Metropolitan Statistical Area. As of 2007, Leicester's population is 12,514 people. Since 2000, it has had a population growth of 16.26 percent.

History 
Starting in April 1829, a Post Office began operating in the area, then called Turkey Creek. Frontiersman Leicester Chapman purchased a tract of land in the area from the city of Asheville, becoming the Postmaster in 1852. Seven years later, Chapman renamed the area Leicester for the Earl of Leicester, also his own namesake.

Camp Academy was listed on the National Register of Historic Places in 1985.

Education 
Leicester's schools fall within the Buncombe County School District. There are no schools above the elementary level within the area of the township, although middle- and high-schools exist in neighboring communities that are capable of educating the youth of Leicester. The only K-12 school currently in Leicester is Leicester Elementary.

Geography 
The elevation of Leicester is roughly 2,100 ft. The ZIP Code for Leicester is 28748.

References 

 Powell, William. The North Carolina Gazetteer, University of North Carolina Press, Chapel Hill, 1968

Unincorporated communities in Buncombe County, North Carolina
Asheville metropolitan area
Unincorporated communities in North Carolina
Populated places established in 1829